The Kenya Fluorspar Company is a privately held mining company in Kenya. It is located in Kimwarer, a village in the southern part of the Kerio Valley in Elgeyo-Marakwet County.

History 
In 1967, fluorspar deposits were first discovered in the Kerio Valley, and the Kenyan government established the Fluorspar Company of Kenya to exploit them on a large scale. The company went into receivership in 1979, as Kenya Fluorspar, another government-owned company, bought the assets and took over operations. In 1996, Canadian businessman Charles Field-Marsham acquired Kenya Fluorspar as part of a government reform effort of corporate privatization, entering into a 20-year lease with the government for 3,664 hectares of land..

Kenya Fluorspar halted its mining operations in February 2009 due to an economic downturn, laying off 190 workers, but it resumed operations in June 2010. Operations were scaled down in June 2015, with the company laying off 75 workers and attempting to sell its existing fluorspar stock.

In February 2016, the company announced that it would halt operations again, citing weak global fluorspar demands. By June, the company had halted its operations and laid off approximately 300 directly employed workers. The company's land lease expired in March 2018 and was not renewed. In April 2018, control of the company's mine and various assets reverted to the Kenyan government.

In January 2018, it was announced that the Kenyan government set up a task force to see out the compensation of over 4,000 land owners who were displaced to make way for the company's mining activities in the 1970s. However, disputes among locals over the mode of compensation, with some seeking alternative land and others demanding money, as well as disagreements between locals and state officials over the amount owed, have delayed the process.

Operations 
Kenya Fluorspar's mining operations take place on land leased to the company by the Government of Kenya. The land was acquired in 1976 through a compulsory purchase order and compensation paid by the government. Much of its product is exported to India and Europe. In 2005, production was valued at $14 million.

In March 2012, the company completed a de-bottlenecking of its processing plant to increase its total capacity to 120,000 tonnes, up from 108,000 tonnes in 2011.

The company has asserted that it had taken various steps to address environmental concerns, such as through dust and spillage reduction, water purification and recycling, and tree planting. The company complies with NEMA requirements and holds a certificate of environmental compliance.

Community work and sponsorship 
It is a leading employer in the area with 400 workers and its corporate social responsibilities program provides health, education and other facilities to its e  yees and the local community.

The company sponsors an annual 10 Kilometres road running competition in Kerio Valley  and the Fluorspar FC playing in Nationwide League.

Corporate social responsibility 
In 2008, the company sponsored an annual 10 km road running competition in Kerio Valley and the football team Fluorspar F.C., which competed in the Nationwide League.

In August 2012, the company launched a taekwondo gym known as the Kenya Fluorspar Centre in Kerio Valley.

See also
 Uses of Fluorites
 Mining

References

External links
 Kenya Fluorspar Company official website
 Reuters story, Firebird Fund investment news, Jan 13 2009
 United States Geological Survey, "Fluourspar in the Third Quarter 2008
 Nyambok & Gaciri: Geology of the fluorite deposits in Kerio Valley, Kenya (abstract). Economic Geology; April 1975; v. 70; no. 2; p. 299-307.

Mining companies of Kenya
Elgeyo-Marakwet County
Companies based in Nairobi
Non-renewable resource companies established in 1971
Kenyan companies established in 1971